Nxumalo is a surname. Notable people with the surname include:

JAW Nxumalo South African Writer and Entrepreneur
George Albert Nxumalo South African Head Master, Music teacher
[Bright Nxumalo]] (born 1978), Swazi footballer 
Conny Nxumalo (1967-2020), South African social worker 
Gideon Nxumalo (1929-1970), South African jazz pianist and marimba player
Henry Nxumalo (1917–1957), South African investigative journalist
Muntu Nxumalo (born 1957), South African singer
Mzala Nxumalo (1955-1991), South African activist and intellectual
Prince Nxumalo (born 1990), South African footballer
Samuel Dickenson Nxumalo, South African politician
Shayne Nxumalo, Zimbabwean cricketer
Sishayi Nxumalo (1936–2000), Swazi politician
Tiki Nxumalo (1950–2015), South African actor 
Wonderboy Nxumalo (1975–2008), South African artist